Huker (also Romanized as Hūker and Hūkar) is a village in Poshtdarband Rural District, in the Central District of Kermanshah County, Kermanshah Province, Iran. At the 2006 census, its population was 119, in 27 families.

References 

Populated places in Kermanshah County